The Florida Rugby Union (FRU) is a Geographical Union (GU) that governs the Florida peninsula for USA Rugby. The Florida Rugby Union has four divisions: Men's, Women's, Collegiate Men's, and Collegiate Women's.

Men's clubs
There are currently nineteen registered clubs in the Men's division.

Bay Area Pelicans
 Boca Raton Buccaneers
 Brevard Old Red Eye
 Daytona Beach Coconuts
 Fort Lauderdale Knights
 Gainesville Hogs
 Jacksonville
 Key West
Miami
 Naples Hammerheads
 Okapi Wanderers
Orlando
 Palm Beach Panthers
 Sarasota Surge
 South Florida
 Tallahassee Conquistadors
 Tampa Bay Krewe 
Trident
 Treasure Coast Pirates

Women's clubs
There are currently four registered clubs in the Women's division.
 Jacksonville 
 Fort Miami
 Orlando 	
 Tampa

Collegiate Men's clubs
There are currently eleven registered clubs in the Collegiate Men's division.

 Ave Maria University
 Eckerd College
 Florida Atlantic University
Florida International University
 Florida State University
 Saint Thomas University
 University of Central Florida  	
 University of Florida  	
 University of Miami  	
 University of North Florida 			
 University of South Florida

Collegiate Women's clubs
There are currently nine registered clubs in the Collegiate Women's division.
 University of Florida
 Florida State University 
 Florida Atlantic University	
 Saint Thomas University
 University of Miami
 University of South Florida		
 University of Central Florida
 Florida International University
 Eckerd College

Leadership

President 

 John Clements (1974-77)
 Bill Crusselle (1977-78)
 Kevin Kitto (1978-82)
 Jim Millar (1984)
 Bing Towne (1993-1995)
 Brian Brantley (1996-1998)
Ken Simmons (2001-2002)
Mark Etue (2003-2006)
John Devonport (2007-2010)
Franklyn Williams (2011-2013)
 Dr. Kerri O'Malley (2014–2022)
 Richard Comisky (2022–Present)

Vice president 
 Peter Gibson (1974)
Vic Langley (1996)
Richard Elliott (1996)
Ian Henry (2019–2022)
Jessica Premet (2019–Present)
Mary Leigh Miller (2019–Present)
Gonzalo Michanie (2022-Present)

Secretary 
 Roy Brewer (1974)
James Bledsoe (1979)
Joy Striepe (1996)
Richard Comisky (2019–2021)
Melissa Brewer (2022–Present)

Treasurer 
 Roy Brewer (1974)
Dr. Stuart Roath (1996)
Matthew Tierney (2019)
Kiel McAuley (2020–2021)

President Emeritus 
 Dr. Kerri O'Malley (2022–Present)

See also
Rugby union in the United States

References

External links
USA Rugby Official Site
World Rugby Official Site

Rugby union governing bodies in the United States
Rugby union in Florida